Baron Grégoire de Mevius (born 16 August 1962) is a Belgian rally driver active in the years 1988–2001. He first broke out into the World Rally Championship scene racing in the Group N category in the Mazda 323. With an unsuccessful spell of Group A races in 1990, he was never considered to be a talent in spotlight of rally stardom. However, in 1993 he finally managed to secure a place as a privateer in the Group A WRC category. Although he never challenged for the title effectively, he made some good efforts scoring within the top 6 in several gravel rallies. His best result was in the 1998 Network Q Rally of Great Britain where he secured a 4th place in the Privateer Belgacom Turbo Team' Subaru Impreza.

It is often seen that after his retirement in the WRC, he has moved on to the Paris-Dakar Rally where he often competes with the Nissan Team in the Nissan Navara pick-up truck.

His sons, Ghislain De Mévius and Guillaume De Mévius, are also rally drivers.

References

1962 births
Living people
Belgian rally drivers
World Rally Championship drivers
Dakar Rally drivers

Nismo drivers